Scythris caballoides is a moth of the family Scythrididae. It was described by Kari Nupponen in 2009. It is found in Uzbekistan. The habitat consists of riverside woods, surrounded by desert steppes.

The wingspan is 11-12.5 mm. The forewings are densely mixed with dark brown and greyish white. There is a broad and rather indistinct creamy-white streak in the fold from the base to the subapical area and there are more or less distinct narrow spots below the fold at 0.25 and 0.5, and small one at 0.7 near the dorsum. The hindwing are fuscous.

Etymology
The species name to shape of tergum VIII in the male abdomen, resembling the head of a horse (Equus caballus) at the dorsal view.

References

caballoides
Moths described in 2009
Moths of Asia